Victory and Homeland Thanksgiving Day and the Day of Croatian Defenders is a public holiday in Croatia that is celebrated annually on 5 August, commemorating the Croatian War of Independence. On that date in 1995 the Croatian Army took the city of Knin during Operation Storm, which effectively brought an end to Republic of Serbian Krajina proto-state. In 2008, the Croatian Parliament also assigned the name Day of Croatian Defenders to the holiday, which honors the current service members and veterans of the Armed Forces of Croatia.

Celebrations 
The main celebration is centered in Knin where there are festivities commemorating the event, beginning with a mass and laying of wreaths in honour of those who died in the war, and continuing with parades and concerts. The event is attended by thousands, including the country's leading politicians. The Flag of Croatia on Knin Fortress is ceremonially raised as part of the celebrations.

2015 parade 
A special military parade of the Armed Forces in honor of Victory Day was held on 4 August 2015 in Zagreb, celebrating the twentieth anniversary of Operation Storm. The parade was opened by the Honor Guard Battalion on the lawns of the National and University Library, with three MiG-21's flying over the city. "Lijepa naša domovino" was performed by the 12-year-old Mia Negovetić, accompanied by the Croatian Armed Forces Band and the Croatian Navy's vocal ensemble. It aroused great public interest considering that the last military parade in Croatia was organized in 1997. About 100,000 spectators attended the parade, additional sound systems were installed at the last minute until the intersection of City of Vukovar and Savska Streets. The editorial board of the Zagreb-based Jutarnji list, gave a positive review of the parade, demanding the introduction of regular parades for Victory Day. Military analyst Igor Tabak praised the event, while criticizing the inauthenticity of certain "historical units".

Silver jubilee 
On the silver jubilee in 2020, the celebrations were attended for the first time ever by an ethnic Serb political representative, Deputy Prime Minister Boris Milošević, a move which was applauded across the political spectrum, with Prime Minister Andrej Plenković among others stating that it will "send a new message for Croatian society". On top of this, Plenković, as well as President Zoran Milanović sent messages of peace to the people of Serbia. Opposition to the move from the Deputy Prime Minister came from members of the political far-right such as the Homeland Movement and the Croatian Defence Forces, as well as from politicians from Serbia and Republika Srpska.

See also
Public holidays in Croatia
Operation Storm
Victory Day in other countries

References

Public holidays in Croatia
August observances
Homeland thanksgiving
Croatian War of Independence
Annual events in Croatia
Summer events in Croatia